The following table indicates the party of elected officials in the U.S. state of Kansas:
Governor
Lieutenant governor
Secretary of state
Attorney general
State treasurer
Insurance commissioner

The table also indicates the historical party composition in the:
State Senate
State House of Representatives
State delegation to the U.S. Senate
State delegation to the U.S. House of Representatives

For years in which a presidential election was held, the table indicates which party's nominees received the state's electoral votes.

1861–1974

1975–present

References

See also
Law and government in Kansas

Politics of Kansas
Government of Kansas
Kansas